Ghotra is a clan found among the Labana in the states of Punjab and Haryana in India.

References 

Social groups of Punjab, India
Social groups of Haryana
Ramgarhia clans
Sikh names